Lucio Battisti (5 March 1943 – 9 September 1998) was an influential Italian singer-songwriter and composer. He is widely recognized for songs that defined the late 1960s and 1970s era of Italian songwriting.

Battisti released 18 studio albums from 1969 to 1994, with a significant portion of this catalogue translated into Spanish (various albums), English (one album), French (two albums), and German (one album). He was known to be an extremely reserved artist, performing only a small number of live concerts during his career. In 1978 he announced that he would speak to the public only through his musical work, limiting himself to the recording of studio albums and disappearing from the public scene.

Biography

Musician and composer
Battisti was born in Poggio Bustone, a small town in the province of Rieti (northern Lazio), and moved with his family to Rome in 1950. A self-taught guitarist, Battisti made his debut as musician in the 1960s, performing in local bands in Rome, Naples and later in Milan, where he joined I Campioni (The Champions), the support band of then famous singer Tony Dallara. He also travelled abroad as a working musician in Germany and the UK, where he absorbed blues, soul, and the music of Bob Dylan, The Beatles, The Rolling Stones, The Animals, and Jimi Hendrix, among others, introducing those influences into Italian pop music.

In Milan he found the support of the French talent scout Christine Leroux, who worked for the Ricordi music label. Under Leroux's wing, Battisti penned three sizeable hits in 1966 for other artists ("Per una lira" for Ribelli, "Dolce  di giorno" for Dik Dik, and "Uno in più" for Riki Maiocchi). Leroux also introduced Battisti to lyricist Giulio Rapetti, better known as Mogol. Though not impressed at first by Battisti's music, Mogol later declared to have started the collaboration after recognizing Battisti's humble, though determined, desire to improve his work. Mogol also pushed Ricordi to allow Battisti to sing his own songs: Battisti's voice became the focal point of his strength and originality. As a singer, he made his debut with the song "Per una lira" in 1966: despite the song's poor success (only 520 copies sold throughout Italy), it allowed him to begin building his career as a singer.

Battisti continued to write for others during the late 1960s: the US rock group The Grass Roots scored a hit with one of Battisti's compositions, "Balla Linda" (translated as "Bella Linda"), which earned Battisti fourth place in the Cantagiro, a then-popular Italian popular music competition. In 1967, English band The Hollies—featuring Graham Nash—recorded a Battisti song in Italian, "Non prego per me". In 1969, Battisti's song "Il Paradiso" was covered by the group Amen Corner as "(If Paradise Is) Half as Nice", hitting the number-one spot on the UK singles chart.

Success as a solo singer in 1970s – The Mogol-Battisti duo

In 1969, Battisti took part in the Festival of Sanremo, with the song "Un'avventura", and his popularity began to increase. His first hit was "Acqua azzurra, acqua chiara", which won the Festivalbar. The same year, Ricordi issued Battisti's self-titled debut album. During this successful year he met Grazia Letizia Veronese, whom he later married and lived with until his death.

Forming a strong and highly successful duo with lyricist Mogol, Battisti continued to issue solo albums on a regular basis throughout the 1970s. In almost every case they reached the highest places in his country's charts, and are regarded as classics of Italian pop music ("musica leggera"). He also became a popular presence on television.

In 1970 Battisti won Festivalbar for the second time in a row, with the song "Fiori rosa, fiori di pesco", and he and Mogol started to collaborate with vocalist Mina, who sang some of their most-acclaimed songs. In December, Ricordi issued Battisti's second LP, Emozioni, a compilation of previously released singles. Battisti was really angry about this, as he had composed a concept album called Amore e non-amore, but his label chose to release the compilation rather than the album, which was considered to be too experimental and advanced for the Italian audience.

Amore e non-amore was eventually released in July 1971, but to preserve their creative freedom, Battisti and Mogol moved over to Numero Uno, one of Italy's first independent record labels, founded by them in 1969. In the same year English band Love Affair| recorded the song "Wake Me I Am Dreaming", a cover of "Mi ritorni in mente".

The new label released Umanamente uomo: il sogno (1972) followed by the even more successful Il mio canto libero (1972). The latter topped the Italian charts for 8 weeks: one of its songs – "Io vorrei, non vorrei, ma se vuoi" – was later recorded by Mick Ronson with lyrics translated by David Bowie, as "Music Is Lethal" (on the album Slaughter on 10th Avenue). The song "Il mio canto libero" has remained one of the most popular songs among Italians. Another successful album was Il nostro caro angelo (1973).

U.S. magazine Billboard nominated Battisti "Italian Personality of the Year" in 1972, defining him "singer, composer, music publisher of international fame, has elevated Italian audience's taste and strengthened the market".

Anima latina (1974) is considered Battisti's most complex and multi-layered work, a new personal approach to progressive rock with an increased attention to rhythms and increasingly cryptic lyrics by Mogol; nonetheless, their work enjoyed a good success, remaining for 13 weeks at number one in Italian chart.

Lucio Battisti, la batteria, il contrabbasso, eccetera, released in 1976 and including the hit "Ancora tu", was an even bigger success; many of the songs clearly showing the artist's interest in the then-emerging Disco sounds and production values that would have a large influence on his three subsequent albums.

In 1977 he released Io tu noi tutti. He also relocated to Los Angeles, and issued an album, Images, that featured some of his biggest hits re-recorded in English. However, the attempt to equal his European success in the United States failed. In 1978 Battisti released Una donna per amico: recorded in London and produced by Geoff Westley, it was his best-selling LP. This was followed in 1980 by Una giornata uggiosa, produced by the same team. It contained Battisti's last great success, "Con il nastro rosa". Considered one of the duo's best compositions, it featured a long guitar solo by Phil Palmer. Battisti's songs written with Mogol continue to be covered by international artists; a more recent example is Tanita Tikaram's "And I Think of You" ("E penso a te").

Battisti, a rather shy person, had always been reluctant to talk about himself and his work. In the early 1980s he declared he would no longer make public appearances nor release any interviews: in his words "[he was going to] speak no more, since an artist must communicate with the public only through his work". In some very rare occasions, though, he appeared as a TV guest in other countries such as France, Switzerland and Germany, and only after 1982 can his vow be considered completely fulfilled, with a perseverance similar to that of J. D. Salinger and other famous recluses.

"Second period"

In 1981 Battisti broke the partnership with Mogol, switching to a more experimental inspiration based often on electronic instruments. The LPs of his "second period", starting from E già of 1982 (with lyrics by his wife), received a mixed reception from both critics and audiences. Mogol started to work with Riccardo Cocciante; in 1990, he declared he had not listened to Battisti's LPs for many years.

From 1986, starting with Don Giovanni, to 1994, the lyrics on Battisti's albums were written by the poet Pasquale Panella. Don Giovanni combined a return to classic "Battistian" melodies with lyrics which some felt were weird and often seemingly meaningless. Others, however, understood the lyrics to be cryptic, an intellectual mind game of sorts. Don Giovanni had a reasonable success in Italy.

The following L'apparenza (1988), however, again contained rather impervious lyrics; its success was worse than the one had by Don Giovanni, in chart position as well as in sales volumes. La sposa occidentale (1990) was released for CBS, and marked another fall in sales and success. The declining sales were hardly a concern for Battisti: it was rumoured that in the 1990s he was earning 4–5 billion lire a year (approximately 3 million Euro in 2006) solely from author rights of his 1970s songs.

Battisti's last albums were Cosa succederà alla ragazza (1992) and Hegel (1994).

Death
On 9 September 1998, Battisti died in a Milan hospital. The New York Times said the cause was cancer. He was also said to have been suffering from glomerulonephritis. The news spread quickly throughout the country, generating an unprecedented wave of emotion for the singer-songwriter. He was later buried in the cemetery of Molteno, the town where he had spent his last years with his family.

Several compilations of his best tracks have surfaced after Battisti's death, including 2000's Battisti and 2001's Canzoni d'amore. His catalogue is published by BMG Music Publishing.

Influence and praise
Through the years, Battisti consolidated his status as one of the most well-known Italian singers. His songs remain immensely popular in Italy, and are often performed live by other professional musicians. The minor planet 9115 Battisti was named in his memory. It was discovered by two Italian astronomers at the Sormano Astronomical Observatory in northern Italy near his home-town.
In an interview, David Bowie claimed to consider Lucio Battisti his absolute favourite Italian artist and the greatest singer in the world along with Lou Reed. He also translated a song of his, Io vorrei... Non vorrei... Ma se vuoi, for Mick Ronson's debut album.
Bowie aside, other international celebrities expressed their esteem for Battisti. For example, Paul McCartney, Pete Townshend and Laura Pausini.

Discography

Albums

Singles

English language recordings
A few of his songs were translated into English. The album Images was the only official worldwide release, however in Britain a single was published with two other translations: "Baby It's You"("Ancora tu") and "Lady" ("Donna selvaggia donna"). A full translation of the album Una donna per amico, to be called Friends, which had the above songs, was recorded but never published. The two songs and the album were translated and produced by Frank Musker.

Full list of Battisti's English recordings: 
Released
 Images
 "Baby It's You" ("Ancora tu")
 "Lady" ("Donna selvaggia donna")
Unreleased
 "My Father Told Me" – instrumental of "Nel sole, nel vento, nel sorriso, e nel pianto"
 "Wake Me I Am Dreaming – "Mi ritorni in mente"
 "You and Your Tomorrow" – "Acqua azzurra, acqua chiara"
 The following were considered for Images, translated not by Peter Powell but by Marva Jan Marrow:
 "Star in a Film" – "L'interprete di un film"
 "Since I Have Forgotten About You" – "Eppur mi son scordato di te" with different accompaniment melody and an acoustic guitar
 "Our Dear Angel" – "Il nostro caro angelo"
 "Freedom Song" – An alternate translation of "Il mio canto libero", sung solo and with guitar
 "The Sun Song" – An alternate translation of "La canzone del sole", set to the original Italian version's melody
 "To Love a Bit" – "Amarsi un po'", the words were changed into "To feel in love" for the album
 Friends – A translation of the album Una donna per amico, replacing the song "Maledetto gatto" with translations of two of his other hits. All the songs were translated by Frank Musker.
 "Baby it's You" – shorter version
 "And I Think of You" – previous hit "E penso a te", different from the tribute by Tanita Tikaram
 "Take it as it Comes" – "Prendila così"
 "Lady" – slightly different from released version
 "Day to Day" – "Perché no"
 "Afraid of Falling" – "Aver paura di innamorarsi troppo"
 "Pain is Gone" – "Nessun dolore"
 "A Woman as a Friend" – "Una donna per amico"
 "Let's Go See a Movie" – "Al cinema"
 "Pain is Gone" and "A woman as a Friend" were recorded twice. The first version of "Pain is Gone" places an emphasis on bongos and the chorus sings "Nessun dolore" in the background; the second version has an English repetition in the background. The only major difference between the two "A Woman as a Friend" versions is the second verse.

References

External links

  www.luciobattisti.info – Discography and others information about the singer
  Full discography

1943 births
1998 deaths
People from the Province of Rieti
Italian male singer-songwriters
20th-century Italian male singers
Deaths from cancer in Lombardy